The Alvarado Independent School District is a public school district based in Alvarado, Texas, United States. In addition to Alvarado, the district also serves the unincorporated community of Lillian. The district operates one high school, Alvarado High School.

History
The Lillian Independent School District consolidated into Alvarado ISD on July 1, 1986.

Finances
As of the 2010–11 school year, the appraised valuation of property in the district was $1,536,036,000. The maintenance tax rate was $0.104 and the bond tax rate was $0.028 per $100 of appraised valuation.

Academic achievement
In 2011, the school district was rated "academically acceptable" by the Texas Education Agency.  Forty-nine percent of districts in Texas in 2011 received the same rating. No state accountability ratings will be given to districts in 2012. A school district in Texas can receive one of four possible rankings from the Texas Education Agency: Exemplary (the highest possible ranking), Recognized, Academically Acceptable, and Academically Unacceptable (the lowest possible ranking).

Historical district TEA accountability ratings
2011: Academically Acceptable
2010: Academically Acceptable
2009: Academically Acceptable
2008: Academically Acceptable
2007: Academically Acceptable
2006: Academically Acceptable
2005: Academically Acceptable
2004: Academically Acceptable

Schools
In the 2011-2012 school year, the district had students in nine schools.
Regular instructional
Alvarado High School (Grades 9-12)
Alvarado Junior High School (Grades 6-8)
Alvarado Intermediate School (Grades 3-5)
Alvarado Elementary North (Grades PK-2)
Alvarado Elementary South (Grades PK-2)
Lillian Elementary School (Grades PK-2)
Alternative instructional
Alvarado ISD Accelerated Education (Grades 9-12)
JJAEP instructional
Juvenile Justice Alternative (Grades 6-12)
DAEP instructional
Alternative Learning Center (Grades 6-12)

Special programs

Athletics
Alvarado High School participates in the boys sports of baseball, basketball, football, soccer, track, cross country, and wrestling. The school participates in the girls sports of basketball, soccer, softball, track, cross country, and volleyball. For the 2016 through 2017 school years, Alvarado High School will play football in UIL Class 4A.

See also

List of school districts in Texas
List of high schools in Texas

References

External links
Alvarado ISD

School districts in Johnson County, Texas